Percy Summers was an English professional footballer who played as a goalkeeper in the Football League for Grimsby Town. He notably made over 130 Midland League appearances for Chesterfield Town.

Personal life 
Prior to becoming a professional footballer, Summers worked as a mechanic in a coal mine near Rhondda. Summers served as a private in the Football Battalion of the Middlesex Regiment during the First World War. In 1916, he received hand and stomach wounds during the Battle of the Somme and was medically discharged from the army.

Career statistics

References

English footballers
English Football League players
Association football goalkeepers
Chesterfield F.C. players
1889 births
Grimsby Town F.C. players
British Army personnel of World War I
Middlesex Regiment soldiers
Luton Town F.C. players
Margate F.C. players
Midland Football League players
Date of death missing
Southern Football League players
English miners
Reading F.C. wartime guest players
Sheffield Wednesday F.C. wartime guest players
Footballers from Sheffield
Date of birth unknown
Date of death unknown
Place of death unknown
Military personnel from Sheffield